Květa Peschke and Katarina Srebotnik were the defending champions, but decided not to play together. Peschke partnered with Anna-Lena Grönefeld, but lost in the quarterfinals to Maria Kirilenko and Nadia Petrova. Srebotnik played alongside Zheng Jie, but lost in the semifinals to Nuria Llagostera Vives and Sania Mirza.
Third seeds Ekaterina Makarova and Elena Vesnina won the title, defeating Llagostera Vives and Mirza in the final by the score of 7–5, 7–5.

Seeds
The top four seeds received a bye into the second round.

Draw

Finals

Top half

Bottom half

References
 Main Draw

China Open - Doubles
2012 China Open (tennis)